Friedhelm Loh (born 16 August 1946) is a German billionaire businessman. He is the founder and chairman of the Friedhelm Loh Group, a manufacturing company that grew out of a business he inherited from his father.

Early life
Friedhelm Loh is the son of Rudolf Loh, who founded a company in 1961 after inventing the "first mass-produced enclosures for electrical control systems".

Career
Loh is the chairman of the Friedhelm Loh Group.

As of July 2021, Forbes estimated Loh's net worth at US$9.7 billion.

Personal life
He is married with three children and lives in Haiger, Germany.

References

1946 births
Living people
People from Lahn-Dill-Kreis
German billionaires
Businesspeople from Hesse
20th-century German businesspeople
21st-century German businesspeople